The Goods was a Canadian daytime television talk show which aired on CBC Television from October 3, 2016 to May 10, 2018. Formatted as a lifestyle show, each of the four hosts specialized in a different subject area: Steven Sabados on home and design, Jessi Cruickshank on style and fashion, Andrea Bain on relationships and sexuality, and Shahir Massoud on food. The show was created as a replacement for Sabados' earlier CBC series Steven and Chris, which was cancelled in 2015 following the death of his husband and co-host Chris Hyndman.

CBC announced that the series was cancelled after two seasons on April 17, 2018. The final episode aired on May 10, 2018.

The Goods was nominated for a Canadian Screen Award for Best Lifestyle Program or Series at the 6th Canadian Screen Awards in 2018.

References

External links

CBC Television original programming
2016 Canadian television series debuts
2010s Canadian television talk shows
2018 Canadian television series endings